Noor Sabri Abbas Hasan Al-Baidawi, simply known as Noor Sabri (born 6 June 1984 in Baghdad, Iraq) is an Iraqi professional goalkeeper. He plays for Samarra in the Iraqi Premier League. He played 16 years for the Iraqi national team and retired from international football in 2018.

Career
Noor Sabri belongs to the country's golden generation that was nurtured by Adnan Hamad. He broke on to the Asian scene in the AFC Youth Championship 2000, when he warmed the bench until the final game against Japan. Despite serving as the replacement for the suspended first choice Ahmed Ali Jaber, Sabri earned praise for keeping Iraq in contention before Emad Mohammed scored the title-winning goal.

He was quickly back on the sidelines as the team played in the subsequent 2001 FIFA U-20 World Cup in Argentina, where they failed to progress beyond the group stage. However, although he served as a back-up to Jaber with the national youth team, Sabri proved a fast learner at the club level and went from strength to strength with Iraqi first division side Al-Zawraa. He saved two penalties in the 2002 WAFF Championship semi-final penalty shootout to help Iraq eliminate rivals Iran on their way to the title. His improvement impressed German coach Bernd Stange so much that the youngster was called into the team that eventually booked a surprise berth to the 2004 Summer Olympics. He started in all six of Iraq's games during their campaign and performed admirably as Iraq stormed into the last four. He won the Damascus International Championship in 2005 with Al-Talaba when they defeated Al-Zawraa 5–4 on penalties in the final with Noor saving two penalties and scoring one himself in the shootout. Like many of his team-mates on the Olympic squad, Sabri graduated to the country's senior team. He went on to make the No. 1 jersey his own in the ensuing years and was part of the side that earned Iraq's maiden continental title in 2007, conceding just two goals throughout Iraq's title-winning campaign.

Sabri impressed throughout the competition as Iraq reached the semi-final, where they were presented with the daunting task of facing the Korea Republic. The two sides remained level at 0–0 after extra time and a penalty shootout beckoned. After both sides were on target in the first three rounds, Sabri made a decisive save by tipping away Yeom Ki-Hun's shot. After Kim Jung-Woo hit the post in their final attempt, it was Sabri and his team-mates who, against all expectations, progressed to the final.

In March 2016, Sabri announced his retirement from international football, adding that the reason is to allow young players an opportunity to represent the Iraqi national team. In March 2018, he returned to the national team to play his 100th match.

On 24 June 2018, Noor Sabri joined Saudi club Hajer.

Honours

Iraq
 2002 WAFF champions
 2004 Athens Olympics: fourth place
 2005 West Asian Games Gold medallist.
 AFC Asian Cup: 2007
 2012 Arab Nations Cup Bronze medallist

Al-Zawraa
 2000–01 Iraqi Premier League

Naft Al-Wasat
 2014–15 Iraqi Premier League

Individual
 2007 AFC Asian Cup goalkeeper of the tournament
 21st Arabian Gulf Cup goalkeeper of the tournament.
 Soccer Iraq Team of the Decade: 2010–2019

Personal life
Noor Sabri is Shia Muslim and married. He has 4 children.

See also
 List of men's footballers with 100 or more international caps

References

External links

Living people
2004 AFC Asian Cup players
Footballers at the 2004 Summer Olympics
2007 AFC Asian Cup players
2009 FIFA Confederations Cup players
AFC Asian Cup-winning players
Association football goalkeepers
Iraqi footballers
1984 births
Iraq international footballers
Sanat Mes Kerman F.C. players
Expatriate footballers in Iran
Iraqi expatriate sportspeople in Iran
Olympic footballers of Iraq
Sportspeople from Baghdad
Iraqi Shia Muslims
Iraqi expatriate footballers
Al-Zawraa SC players
Al-Quwa Al-Jawiya players
Najaf FC players
Al-Shorta SC players
Al-Mina'a SC players
Naft Maysan FC players
Hajer FC players
Saudi First Division League players
Expatriate footballers in Saudi Arabia
Iraqi expatriate sportspeople in Saudi Arabia
FIFA Century Club